Khishigdalain Battulga (born 3 September 1974) is a Mongolian international footballer. He made his first appearance for the Mongolia national football team in 2000.

References

1974 births
Mongolian footballers
Mongolia international footballers
Living people
Association football defenders